Batsari is a Local Government Area in Katsina State, Nigeria. Its headquarters are in the town of Batsari.

It has an area of 1,107 km and a population of 208,978 at the 2006 census.

The postal code of the area is 820.

References

Local Government Areas in Katsina State